Norman Petty (May 25, 1927 – August 15, 1984) was an American musician, record producer, publisher, radio station owner, and considered to be one of the founding fathers of early rock & roll.

Biography

Petty was born in the small town of Clovis, New Mexico. He began playing piano at a young age. While in high school, he regularly performed on a 15-minute show on a local radio station. After his graduation in 1945, he was drafted into the United States Air Force. When he returned, he married his high-school sweetheart Violet Ann Brady on June 20, 1948. The couple lived briefly in Dallas, Texas, where Petty worked as a part-time engineer at a recording studio. Eventually, they moved back to their hometown of Clovis.

Petty and his wife, Vi, founded the Norman Petty Trio with guitarist Jack Vaughn. Due to the local success of their independent debut release of "Mood Indigo", they landed a recording contract with RCA Records and sold half a million copies of the recording, and were voted Most Promising Instrumental Group of 1954 by Cashbox magazine. In 1957, their song "Almost Paradise" hit number 18, and Petty won his first BMI writers' award. The song had various cover versions released, with Roger Williams' version selling the best.

Despite the success of his own records, Petty began construction of his Clovis studio in late 1954. The new studio was state of the art, his estimated spending at about $100,000 (US$ in  dollars). With the success of "Almost Paradise", it was completed to its current state in mid-1957. In his original 7th Street studio, aside from songs for his own musical group, he also produced singles (several which were hits) for West Texas musicians Roy Orbison, Buddy Knox, Waylon Jennings, Charlie "Sugartime" Phillips, Sonny West, Carolyn Hester, Johnny "Peanuts" Wilson, and Billy Walker. Sizeable hits "Sugar Shack", "Bottle of Wine" by Jimmy Gilmer and the Fireballs, and "Wheels" by the String-A-Longs were recorded at Petty's studio in the 1960s.

Due to the success with instrumental groups, Petty was a reputable producer for bands of that genre and his Clovis Studio was one of the top "go-to" studios for the guitar instrumental (surf) sound in the early 1960s. Notable musicians who visited during the 1960s were The Champs (featuring members Seals & Crofts and Glen Campbell), J.D. Souther (& The Cinders), Johnny Duncan (country singer), and Eddie Reeves.

Petty produced a number of Canadian recording artists, including Wes Dakus and the Rebels, Barry Allen, Gainsborough Gallery, and the Happy Feeling, all of whom had chart success in their homeland. Norman also produced sessions in England for artists such as Brian Poole & The Tremeloes and Buddy Britten, and in Belgium for Roman Reed, Merino Costa, and The Pebbles, among others. Throughout the 1950s and 1960s, recordings produced by Petty, in various musical styles, were issued by virtually every major record label in the United States and Canada, with numerous regional successes.

Petty produced the majority of Buddy Holly's recordings from 1956 thru 1958 at his Clovis studio, while some recordings were recorded at Bell Sound in New York. After Holly's death, Petty was put in charge of overdubbing unfinished Holly recordings by request of the Holley family (Buddy's parents) and demos, which resulted in chart success overseas.

Petty purchased the Mesa Theater on Main Street in Clovis in 1960. In 1963, he launched the FM radio station KTQM starting as an easy-listening station, later switching to country-and-western music, and then in 1968 to top-40 rock. The country genre had local appeal, so he applied for a new station license and started KWKA 680 AM in 1971, airing country-and-western music. Petty ran both stations until 1979. The stations were sold by Curry County Broadcasting to Zia Broadcasting in 2010.

Petty died in Lubbock, Texas, in August 1984, of leukemia. Later in 1984, he was posthumously named Clovis Citizen of the Year. His wife, Vi, died in March 1992. She helped start the "Norman and Vi Petty Music Festival" in Clovis in 1987, which ran until 1997. It featured many artists who had recorded at the Clovis studio and also popular hit makers. Robert Linville requested the name from the Chamber of Commerce and started the festivals again from 1998 until his death in 2001.

Norman and Vi were given awards for "Outstanding Graduate Accomplishment" (in the classes of 1945 and 1946, respectively) by the Clovis Municipal Schools Foundation and Alumni Association in April 2011. The awards are presented to Clovis High School graduates for achievement in their sphere of business; the recipients are chosen because their strength of character and citizenship, to serve as models for today's CHS students. The plaques were given to Vi's relative Nick Brady, who turned them over to Kenneth Broad of the Petty estate to display during studio tours. The original 7th Street Studio is available for tours by appointment only.

The King of Clovis, a book about Petty by Frank Blanas, was published in 2014.

Petty's Nor-Va-Jak record label was revived in 2016 as "Nor-Va-Jak Music", with authorization from Norman Petty Studios, for the purpose of reissuing Petty productions that were not previously available in digital form. Previously, many Petty productions had been issued on CD in the UK by Ace Records. Petty's legendary 7th Street Studio is still open for public tours and is considered to be the world's most authentic vintage recording studio.

References

Further reading

External links
 "Norman Petty Studios / Nor-Va-Jak Music". Official Website and Record Label
 "Almost Paradise: The Definitive History". DVD documentary
 "Norman Petty Studios/Nor-Va-Jak Music" on Facebook
 
 
 "Interview with Norman Petty". Songwriter magazine, International Songwriters Association
 "Norman Petty Interview" on Pop Chronicles (recorded April 1968)
 Findagrave

1927 births
1984 deaths
20th-century American businesspeople
20th-century American pianists
People from Clovis, New Mexico
American music managers
American pop pianists
American male pianists
American organists
American male organists
Record producers from Texas
Buddy Holly
Songwriters from New Mexico
People from Lubbock, Texas
American audio engineers
Apex Records artists
Deaths from leukemia
Deaths from cancer in Texas
Songwriters from Texas
X Records artists
20th-century American male musicians